Raymond Toscanelli (22 September 1921 – 1 March 2015) was a French football player and coach.

Career
Born in Reims, Toscanelli played for Cholet, Angers and Montpellier, and managed Cholet.

References

1921 births
2015 deaths
Association football midfielders
French footballers
SO Cholet players
Angers SCO players
Montpellier HSC players
Ligue 2 players
Ligue 1 players
French football managers